The Chisholm Hills are a group of steep-sided hills situated  east of Gair Mesa in the Southern Cross Mountains, Victoria Land. They were named by the southern party of the New Zealand Geological Survey Antarctic Expedition, 1966–67, for Ross Chisholm, leader of the party.

References 

Hills of Victoria Land
Borchgrevink Coast